Luke Doneathy (born 26 July 2002) is an English cricketer. In 2019, aged just 16, Doneathy was given the opportunity to captain the first eleven of Benwell Hill Cricket Club by director of cricket Kyle Coetzer. He made his Twenty20 debut on 9 July 2021, for Durham in the 2021 T20 Blast. Prior to his Twenty20 debut, Doneathy played for the England under-19 cricket team. He made his List A debut on 22 July 2021, for Durham in the 2021 Royal London One-Day Cup.

References

External links
 

2002 births
Living people
Cricketers from Newcastle upon Tyne
English cricketers
Durham cricketers